The 1999 North Carolina A&T Aggies football team represented North Carolina A&T State University as a member of Mid-Eastern Athletic Conference (MEAC) during  the 1999 NCAA Division I-AA football season. Led by 11th-year head coach Bill Hayes, the Aggies compiled an overall record of 11–2 with a mark of 8–0 in conference play, winning the MEAC title. North Carolina A&T earned an automatic bid to the NCAA Division I-AA Football Championship playoffs, where the Aggies beat  in the first round before losing to eventual national runner-up, Youngstown State, in the quarterfinals. The team's performance earned them the program's third black college football national championship. North Carolina A&T played home games at Aggie Stadium in Greensboro, North Carolina.

Previous season
They finished the season 9–3, 6–2 in conference play to finish in 3rd in the MEAC and did not receive an at-large bid for the Division I-AA playoffs.

Schedule

Postseason

2000 NFL draft
The 2000 NFL Draft was held on April 15–16, 2000 at The Theater at Madison Square Garden in New York City. The following A&T players were either selected or signed as undrafted free agents following the draft.

References

North Carolina AandT
North Carolina A&T Aggies football seasons
Black college football national champions
Mid-Eastern Athletic Conference football champion seasons
1999 in sports in North Carolina